"Radar Detector" is the second single from alternative band Darwin Deez. It was released as a digital download on 25 April 2010 and also features on the self-titled debut album Darwin Deez.

Track listing
Digital Download

Chart performance
"Radar Detector" debuted on the UK Singles Chart at number 62 on 11 April 2010. On its second week in the Top 100, the single fell 8 places to number 70, marking Darwin Deez's most successful single to date, having been the only one to crack the Top 100. The single also debuted on the UK Indie Chart at number 5, where it remained for two consecutive weeks. On 25 April 2010, the single fell 3 places to number 8 before falling out of the chart on 2 May 2010. Australian station Triple J announced on January 26, 2011 that "Radar Detector" was the 28th most popular song of 2010 in its annual Hottest 100 poll.

Release history

References

2010 singles
2010 songs
Darwin Deez songs